Evelio Rosero Diago was born in Bogotá, Colombia, on 20 March 1958. He is a Colombian writer and journalist, who won in 2006 the Tusquets Prize.

Evelio Rosero studied primary school in Colombia's southern city of Pasto, and high school in Bogotá, where he later attended Universidad Externado de Colombia obtaining a degree in Journalism. When he was 21, he won Colombia's Premio Nacional de Cuento del Quindío 1979 (National Short Story Award of Quindío), for his piece Ausentes (The Departed) that was published by Instituto Colombiano de Cultura in the book 17 Cuentos colombianos (17 Colombian Short Stories). In 1982 he was awarded with the Premio Iberoamericano de Libro de Cuentos Netzahualcóyotl, in Mexico City  for his earlier stories, and that same year, a novella under the title Papá es santo y sabio (Dad is holy and wise) won Spain's Premio Internacional de Novela Breve Valencia. After these early successes, Rosero fled to Europe and lived first in Paris and later in Barcelona.

His first novel in 1984 was Mateo Solo (Mateo Alone), which began his trilogy known as Primera Vez (First Time).  Mateo Solo is a story about a child confined in his own home. Mateo knows about the outside world for what he sees through the windows. It is a novel of dazzling confinement, where sight is the main character: his sister, his aunt, his nanny all play their own game while allowing Mateo to keep his hope for identity in plotting his own escape.

With his second book in 1986, Juliana los mira (Juliana is watching), Evelio Rosero was translated into Swedish, Norwegian, Danish and German to great acclaim. Once again, the visual experience of a child, this time a girl, builds the world of grownups and family, unveiling all the brutality and meanness of adults as seen with her ingenuousness. Juliana's world is her own house and family. As Juliana watches her parents and relatives, she builds them. Her sight alters objects as she contemplates them. This was the first book where Rosero involved other themes from Colombia's tragical reality such as kidnapping, presented here as a permanent threat that in the end justifies Juliana's own confinement.

In 1988, El Incendiado (The Burning Man) was published. With this book, Rosero obtained a Proartes bachelor in Colombia and won in 1992 the II Premio Pedro Gómez Valderrama for the most outstanding book written between 1988 and 1992. The novel tells the stories of a group of teenagers from a famous school in Bogotá, Colegio Agustiniano Norte, denouncing the education taught by the priest headmasters as "fool, arcaic, troglodite and morbid".

To date, he has written nine novels, beginning with Señor que no conoce luna in 1992 and Cuchilla in 2000 which won a Norma-Fundalectura prize. Plutón (Pluto) published also in 2000, Los almuerzos (The lunches) in 2001, Juega el amor in 2002 and  Los Ejércitos, which won in 2006 the prestigious 2nd Premio Tusquets Editores de Novela and also won in 2009 the prestigious Independent Foreign Fiction Prize organized by the British newspaper The Independent.

Evelio Rosero's motto could be 'a heart that feels, eyes that see'. He has explored in his oeuvre the hidden and alarming ways of life with their insanity and cruelties. New visions on good and evil, adolescence, love and vices and even the horror of Colombia's longtime war are some of the main topics in his books. His stories, sometimes filled with fantastic characters, are beautiful metaphors of humanity and man's fallibility.

Evelio Rosero currently lives in Bogotá. In 2006 he won Colombia's Premio Nacional de Literatura (National Literature Prize) awarded in recognition of a life in letters by the Ministry of Culture. His work has been translated into a dozen European languages.

Los Ejércitos
Los Ejércitos (The Armies) is a novel of a country torn apart by war. Ismael, a retired old school teacher and his wife, Otilia, live morosely and modestly in the town of San José. Ismael loves to spy on his neighbor's wife, making his own wife to feel embarrassed, and there is a sense of idyll on everything going on until some family members begin to disappear and fear takes over the inhabitants of San José. One morning, after his usual walk, Ismael finds out that some soldiers of God knows what armies had taken away his neighbors. His wife had been looking for him and unsuccessfully he tries to find her instead. The fighting intensifies from all sides, and while the citizens of San José decide to run away and join the hordes of displaced peasants of Colombia, Ismael chooses to stay in the blasted and ghost township.

Novels 
Mateo solo. (Entreletras, Bogotá, 1984: 2nd edition, Cooperativa Editorial Magisterio, 1995) 
Juliana los mira. Anagrama, Barcelona. 1986
El incendiado. Editorial Planeta, Bogotá. 1988
Papá es santo y sabio. Calos Valencia Editores, Bogotá. 1989
Señor que no conoce luna. Editorial Planeta, Bogotá. 1992
Cuchilla. Editorial Norma, Bogotá. 2000
Pelea en el Parque. Editorial Magisterio, Bogotá. 1991
Plutón. Editorial Espasa-Calpe, Madrid. 2000
Los almuerzos. Universidad de Antioquia, Medellín. 2001
Juega el amor. Editorial Panamericana, Bogotá. 2002
El hombre que quería escribir una carta. Editorial Norma, Bogotá. 2002
En el lejero. Editorial Norma, Bogotá. 2003
Los escapados. Editorial Norma, Bogotá. 2009
Los ejércitos. Tusquets Editores, Barcelona. 2006
The Armies.  New Directions Publishing, 2009. Translated by Anne McLean.
La Carroza de Bolívar. Tusquets Editores, Barcelona. 2012
Feast of the Innocents. MacLehose Press, 2015. Translated by Anne McLean & Anna Milsom.
Stranger to the Moon. To be published by Mountain Leopard Press in November 2021.

Children's books 
El aprendiz de mago y otros cuentos de miedo. Colcultura, Bogotá. 1992
Cuento para matar a un perro(y otros cuentos). Carlos Valencia Editores, Bogotá. 1989
Las esquinas más largas. Editorial Panamericana, Bogotá. 1998

Poetry 
El eterno monólogo de Llo (poema novelado). Testimonio. 1981
Las lunas de Chía. Fondo Editorial Universidad Eafit, Medellín. 2004

Play 
Ahí están pintados. Editorial Panamericana, Bogotá. 1998

References

External links 
Evelio Rosero Wins Premio Tusquets
Evelio Rosero—Creating Fiction to Comprehend Reality

1958 births
Living people
20th-century Colombian novelists
21st-century Colombian novelists
Colombian male novelists